Enoch Colby Chase (January 16, 1809August 23, 1892) was an American physician, businessman, and Milwaukee County pioneer.  He served three years in the Wisconsin State Senate and five terms in the State Assembly, representing southern Milwaukee County.

Early life
Chase was born in Derby, Vermont, and attended the school of medicine at Bowdoin College before graduating from Dartmouth College as a Doctor of Medicine in 1831. After living for a time in Coldwater, Michigan, and Chicago, Illinois, he moved to Wisconsin in 1835, settling in Milwaukee County, as a farmer and a manufacturer of brick and glassware.

Political career 
Chase served in various political positions in Wisconsin. He was a member of the Assembly three times, in 1852 and 1853 as a Whig and in 1870 as a Democrat. During his first term he was the Whig candidate for Speaker of the House but was defeated by Moses M. Strong. He represented the southern half of Milwaukee County in the Wisconsin State Senate from 1882 through 1884. Chase, originally a Whig, ran as an independent in 1853 against Democrat Francis Ward and later was himself elected as a Democrat. Chase died in Milwaukee, Wisconsin, on August 23, 1892.

Personal life and family
Horace Chase, the 14th mayor of Milwaukee, was a younger brother of Enoch Chase.

Enoch Chase married twice and had at least 11 children, though four died in childhood.  His son Lucian served in the 24th Wisconsin Infantry Regiment during the American Civil War, and died of disease after the Battle of Perryville.

Electoral history

Wisconsin Assembly (1851)

| colspan="6" style="text-align:center;background-color: #e9e9e9;"| General Election, November 4, 1851

Wisconsin Assembly (1852)

| colspan="6" style="text-align:center;background-color: #e9e9e9;"| General Election, November 2, 1852

Wisconsin Assembly (1869)

| colspan="6" style="text-align:center;background-color: #e9e9e9;"| General Election, November 2, 1869

Wisconsin Senate (1881)

| colspan="6" style="text-align:center;background-color: #e9e9e9;"| General Election, November 8, 1881

References

External links
 

1809 births
1892 deaths
Farmers from Wisconsin
Brick manufacturers
Businesspeople from Milwaukee
Dartmouth College alumni
Politicians from Chicago
People from Coldwater, Michigan
People from Derby, Vermont
Politicians from Milwaukee
Physicians from Wisconsin
Wisconsin state senators
Wisconsin Whigs
19th-century American politicians
Democratic Party members of the Wisconsin State Assembly